Axiom Collection series of albums are compilations from the Axiom record label released between 1991 and 1996. 

The first collection, Illuminations, collects one track from each of the label's first ten albums. The second collection, Manifestation, contains mainly non-album mixes and edits.

Subsequent collections were released to highlight specific music forms, and in the main contained new material.

Axiom Collection: Illuminations

Track listing
Simon Shaheen – "Sittel Habayeb" – 6:35 – taken from The Music of Mohamed Abdel Wahab
Material – "Cosmic Slop" – 5:15 – taken from The Third Power
Gnawa Music of Marrakesh – "Baba L'Rouami" – 3:05 – taken from Night Spirit Masters
Jonas Hellborg – "Saut-E Sarmad" – 3:28 – taken from The Word
Mandingo – "Powerhouse" [Edit] – 4:56 – taken from New World Power
Sonny Sharrock – "As we used to sing" – 7:45 – taken from Ask the Ages
Fulani Music of the Gambia – "Nayo" – 3:11 – taken from Ancient Heart
Ginger Baker – "Under black Skies" – 6:59 – taken from Middle Passage
L. Shankar – "Ragam, Tanam, Pallavi Ragam: Kapi, Seethalakshmi Talam: 6 3/4 Beats" [Edit] – 5:20 – taken from Soul Searcher
Ronald Shannon Jackson – "Elders" [Edit] – 5:08 – taken from Red Warrior
Mandinka Music of the Gambia – "Hamaba" – 4:40 – taken from Ancient Heart
Shankar – "Ragam: Kapi" [Edit] – 8:0 – taken from Soul Searcher

Axiom Collection II: Manifestation

Track listing
Material – "Mantra" [Doors of Perception Mix] (Lakshminarayanan Shankar, Caroline, Bill Laswell) – 8:53 – originally on Hallucination Engine
Praxis – "Animal Behavior" [Transmutation Video Version] (Laswell, Bootsy Collins, Buckethead) – 4:45 – originally on Transmutation (Mutatis Mutandis)
Bahia Black – "Captiao Do Asfalto" (Carlinhos Brown) – 5.05 – originally on Ritual Beating System
Material – "Reality Dub" [Virtual Reality Mix] (Shabba Ranks, Laswell, Sly Dunbar, Robbie Shakespeare) – 7:22 – originally on The Third Power
Nicky Skopelitis – "Tarab Dub" [Wasteland Mix] (Nicky Skopelitis, Laswell, Jah Wobble) – 10:11 – originally on Ekstasis
Master Musicians of Jajouka featuring Bachir Attar – "A Habibi Ouajee T'Allel Allaillya" (Hadj Abdelesalam Attar) – 4:12 – originally on Apocalypse Across the Sky
Henry Threadgill – "Better Wrapped / Better Unwrapped" [Edit] (Henry Threadgill) – 4:28 – originally on Too Much Sugar for a Dime
Mandingo – "Lanmbasy Dub" [Kora in Hell Mix] (Foday Musa Suso) – 9:44 – originally on New World Power
Gnawa Music of Marrakesh – "Baniya" (traditional) – 5:59 – originally on Night Spirit Masters
Praxis – "Dead Man Walking" [Edit] (Laswell, Collins, Bernie Worrell, Bryan Mantia, Buckethead, Nathaniel Hall) – 3:33 – originally on Transmutation
Material – "Playin' With Fire" [Praxis Remix / Edit] (Hall, Michael Small, Laswell, Collins, Dunbar, Shakespeare) – 3:57 – originally on The Third Power
Talip Ozkan – "Feridem" (traditional) – 3:59 – originally on The Dark Fire

Axiom Ambient: Lost in the Translation

Directions in music – sound sculptures by Bill Laswell with contributions from Terre Thaemlitz, The Orb, Tetsu Inoue. Created and mastered at Greenpoint Studio, Brooklyn, New York. Produced by Bill Laswell.

CD1
"Eternal Drift" (Bill Laswell, Nicky Skopelitis, Terre Thaemlitz) – 15:53 – originally on Hallucination Engine
"Peace" (Pharoah Sanders, Eddie Hazel, Sonny Sharrock) – 17:11
"Aum" (L. Shankar, Ganam Rao, Jah Wobble, Skopelitis) – 17:37
"Cosmic Trigger" (George Clinton, Bernie Worrell, Laswell, Bootsy Collins, Buckethead) – 16:19

CD2
"Dharmapala" (MA Wahab, Jonas Hellborg) – 14:35
"Flash of Panic" (HA. Attar, Ginger Baker, Skopelitis, Laswell) – 15:17
"Holy Mountain" (Liu Sola, Laswell) – 16:41
"Ruins" (Laswell, Tetsu Inoue) – 8:00 – originally on Hallucination Engine

Side 1
"Eternal Drift" – 9:00
"Aum" – 17:37

Side 2
"Dharmapala" – 8:44
"Holy Mountain" – 8:16

Side 3
"Eternal Drift" [Construct Over Destiny Mix] – 12:02

Side 4
"Holy Mountain" [L.F.O. What Do You Think? Mix] – 9:05

Axiom Funk: Funkcronomicon

A 12" single containing four mixes of "If 6 was 9" was released in 1996 (Axiom/Island, PR12 7212-1) as Axion Funk featuring Bootsy Collins.

CD1
"Order within the Universe" (Bernie Worrell, Bill Laswell, Grand Mixer DXT) – 3:17
"Under the Influence (Jes Grew)" (George Clinton, Laswell, Bootsy Collins, Sly Dunbar, Robbie Shakespeare) – 5.45
"If 6 was 9" (Jimi Hendrix) – 6:00
"Orbitron Attack" (Grace Cook) – 12:29
"Cosmic Slop" (Clinton, Worrell) – 5:15 – taken from Material's The Third Power
"Free-Bass (Godzillatron Cush)" (Laswell, Collins, Weeden) – 5:43
"Tell the World" (Collins, Maceo Parker, Sly Stewart) – 3:53 – taken from Maceo Parker's For All the King's Men
"Pray my Soul" (Cook) – 5:08

CD2
"Hideous Mutant Freekz" (Clinton, Collins, Worrell, Laswell) – 7:25
"Sax Machine" (Collins, Parker, Bobby Byrd) – 7:47 – taken from Maceo Parker's For all the King's Men
"Animal Behavior" (Laswell, Collins, Buckethead) – 7:09 – taken from Praxis Transmutation (Mutatis Mutandis)
"Trumpets and Violins, Violins" (Hendrix) – 3:38
"Telling Time" (Nicky Skopelitis) – 4:57 – taken from Nicky Skopelitis's Ekstasis
"Jungle Free-Bass" (Laswell, Collins) – 5:38
"Blackout" (Blackbyrd McKnight) – 3:44
"Sacred to the Pain" (Cook, Umar Bin Hassan) – 4:54

Axiom Dub: Mysteries of Creation

Compiled, edited and mastered at Greenpoint Studio, Brooklyn, New York.
Conceived and constructed by Bill Laswell.

CD1
Ninj / Bill Laswell – "Maroon Rebellion" (Bill Laswell, Ninj) – 5:55
Ninj – beats
Bill Laswell – bass
Sly and Robbie – "Return to the Bass and Trouble" (Sly Dunbar, Robbie Shakespeare) – 7:00
Sly Dunbar – drums
Robbie Shakespeare – bass
Bill Laswell – sound FX
Sub Dub – "Revolution" (John Ward, Raz Mesinai) – 6:59
John Ward – bass
Raz Mesinai aka the Bedouin – percussion
Tony Buzzeo – guitar
The Orb – "Cocksville U.S.A." (N.Burton, Andy Hughes, Kris Needs, Alex Patterson, Simon Phillips) – 10:32
We featuring DJ Olive, Loop, Once 11 – "Illbient" (Gregor Asch, Rich Panciera, Ignacio Platas) – 8:08
Material – "Ghost Light / Dread Recall" (Laswell) – 14:17
Wordsound I-Powa – "Dungeon of Dub" (Skiz Fernando) – 5:33

CD2
Mad Professor – "Ariwa Dub Club" (Neil Fraser) – 5:06
Automaton – "Beta One / Assyrian Dub" (Bill Laswell, Gabe Katz, Jah Wobble) – 11:12
Jah Wobble, Gabe Katz – bass
Nicky Skopelitis: guitar
Dub Syndicate – "Gun Too Hot" (Style Scott, Adrian Maxwell, Bernard Alexander) – 4:41
produced by Style Scott and Adrian Sherwood
Akuba & I Roy – backing vocals
Errol "Flabba" Holt – bass
Skip McDonald – guitar
Franklyn "Bubbler" Waul – keyboards
Dean Fraser – sax
Keith Sterling – piano, synthesizer
Carlton "Bubblers" Ogilvie – piano, organ, synth
Style Scott – drums, percussion
Scully – percussion
Jah Wobble with Jaki Liebezeit and Neville Murray – "Nev 12" (Jah Wobble, Neville Murray) – 6:08
Jah Wobble – bass
Jaki Liebezeit – drums
Neville Murray – percussion
Techno Animal – "Cyborg Dread" (D.Bennet, Justin Broadrick, Kevin Martin) – 5:39
Dr. Israel – voice
New Kingdom – "Black Falcon Dub" (Jason Furlow, Sebastian Laws, Scott Harding) – 6:06
Scarab – "Fall of the Towers of Convention" (Fernando, Sassan Ghari) – 7:39
Skiz Fernando & Sassan Ghari – sounds
DJ Spooky – "Anansi Abstrakt" (Paul Miller) – 11:37

Axiom: Reconstructions and Vexations
Remixes of tracks from Jah Wobble and Bill Laswell's Radioaxiom: A Dub Transmission, and Tabla Beat Science's Tala Matrix.
Carl Craig – "Alsema Dub mix" (Bill Laswell, Jah Wobble, Ejigayehu Shibabaw) – 6:28
4 Hero – "Orion" [Dollis Dub mix] (Laswell, Wobble) – 5:48
Bedouin Ascent – "Secret Channel" [Asian Resistance mix] (Zakir Hussain, Laswell, K.Biswas) – 9:07
Dr. Israel – "Alam Dub mix" (Laswell, Wobble, Shibabaw) – 8:37
Karsh Kale – "Taarut" [X-Hail the Lehra mix] (Hussain, Ustad Sultan Khan) – 5:18
Carl Craig – "Alsema Dub" [Astral Africa mix] (Laswell, Wobble, Shibabaw) – 10:47
Midival Punditz – "Palmistry" [Pundit Stylee mix] (Karsh Kale) – 4:26
Bill Laswell – "Shiva Myth" (Laswell) – 6:00

Release history
Axiom Collection: Illuminations – 1991 – Axiom / Island, 422-848 958-2 (CD)
Axiom Collection II: Manifestation – 1993 – Axiom / Island, 314-514-453-2 (CD)
Axiom Ambient: Lost in the Translation – 1994 – Axiom / Island, 314-524-053-2 (2CD)
Axiom Ambient: Lost in the Translation – 1994 – Axiom / Island, 314-524-053-1 (2LP, 2000 copies)
Axion Funk: Funkcronomicon – 1995 – Axiom / Island, 314-524-077-2 (2CD)
Axiom Dub: Mysteries of Creation – 1996 – Axiom / Island, 524 313-2 (2CD)
Axiom: Reconstructions & Vexations – 2003 – Axiom / Palm Pictures, PALMCD 2093-2 (CD)

Material (band) albums